Tolentino is a Filipino surname. Notable people with the surname include:
 Abraham Tolentino (born 1964), Filipino politician
 Arturo Tolentino (1910–2004), Filipino politician and diplomat
 Arvin Tolentino (born 1995),  Filipino basketball player
 Aurelio Tolentino (1869–1915), Filipino playwright, poet, journalist, and revolutionary
 Benjamin Tolentino (born 1973), Filipino rower
 Bruce Tolentino (born 1953),  Filipino economist, author, professor, and economic policymaker
 Bruno Tolentino (1940–2007), Brazilian poet and intellectual
 Cristoforo da Tolentino (died 1462), Italian condottiero
 Elias Tolentino (1942–2017), Filipino basketball player 
 Francis Tolentino (born 1960), Filipino politician and lawyer
 Guillermo Tolentino (1890–1976), Filipino sculptor
 Jhett Tolentino (born 1976), Filipino entertainment producer 
 Jia Tolentino (born 1988), American writer and editor
 Jorge Tolentino (born 1963), Cape Verdean politician, writer, diplomat and lawyer
 Julie Tolentino (born 1984), American visual and performance artist, dancer, and choreographer
 Kat Tolentino (born 1995), Filipino-Canadian volleyball player 
 Lorna Tolentino (born 1961), Filipino actress, host and executive producer
 Manny Tolentino (born 1966), former tennis player from the Philippines
 Miggy Tolentino (born 1996), Filipino actor, model and television personality. 
 Nicholas of Tolentino (c. 1246 – 1305), Italian saint and mystic
 Niccolò da Tolentino (c. 1350 – 1435), Italian condottiero
 Regine Tolentino (born 1978), Filipino corporate and TV host, actress, dancer, fashion designer, social media influencer, model and businesswoman
 Shirley Tolentino (1943–2010), New Jersey state court judge
 Thea Tolentino (born 1996), Filipino actress
 Thomas of Tolentino (c. 1255 – 1321), medieval Franciscan missionary
 Tots Tolentino (born 1959), jazz musician from the Philippines
 Wilbert Tolentino (born 1975), Chinese-Filipino entrepreneur from the Philippines

Surnames of Filipino origin